Ridge Street Historic District is a national historic district located at Charlottesville, Virginia. The district encompasses 32 contributing buildings in a four block residential section of the city of Charlottesville. It was primarily developed after the 1870s-1880s.  Notable buildings include the Gleason House (1890s), Fuller-Bailey House (1892), Clarence L. Hawkins House (1915), Bibb-Wolfe House (c. 1850), Gianny-Bailey House (1895), Walters-Witkin House (c. 1881), and Colonel John B. Strange House (1855).

It was listed on the National Register of Historic Places in 1982.

References
Link to Virginia DHR page: https://www.dhr.virginia.gov/historic-registers/104-0025/

Historic districts on the National Register of Historic Places in Virginia
Buildings and structures in Charlottesville, Virginia
National Register of Historic Places in Charlottesville, Virginia